Anthony L. Peratt is an American physicist whose most notable achievements have been in plasma discharge petroglyphs, plasma physics, nuclear fusion and the monitoring of nuclear weapons.

Education 
Peratt was a graduate student of Nobel Prize winning Hannes Alfvén. He received a Ph.D in electrical engineering / plasma physics in 1971 from the University of Southern California (USC), Los Angeles. He was awarded a Master of Science in electrical engineering in 1967, also from USC.

Scientific career 
He worked at the Lawrence Livermore National Laboratory between 1972 and 1979, during which time he held the position of a Guest Physicist at the Max Planck Institute for Physics and Astrophysics at Garching, near Munich, from 1975 to 1977. From 1981 to the present he has worked at the Los Alamos National Laboratory, serving in the Applied Theoretical Physics Division. He had a sabbatical in 1985 as Guest Scientist at the Alfvén Laboratory of the Royal Institute of Technology in Stockholm. He led the N-Tunnel Diagnostics Program for Los Alamos at the Nevada Test Site nuclear testing ground from 1991 to 1993, when he became leader of the American inspection team for the Russian Arctic nuclear test site at Novaya Zemlya. Dr. Peratt was seconded as a Scientific Advisor to the United States Department of Energy (USDOE) from 1995 to 1999. Whilst working for the USDOE he was the Acting Director, National Security, Nuclear Non Proliferation Directorate in 1998.

Research 
He has worked on high-energy-density plasmas and related phenomena, intense particle beams and intense microwave sources, explosively-driven pulsed-power generators, the z-pinch effect, and nuclear fusion target designs.

He is an influential proponent of plasma cosmology, a non-standard cosmology proposed as an alternative to the Big Bang and rejected by mainstream cosmologists. He wrote a book on the subject, was guest editor for the space plasma special editions at the IEEE journal Transactions on Plasma Science devoted primarily to plasma cosmology, and wrote some papers on the subject.

He has researched petroglyphs, some of which he claims are records made in prehistory about significant auroral events caused by intense solar storms. In his surveys of the petroglyphs at Valcamonica (Italy) in April 2004 and El Morro (New Mexico) in April 2010 he was accompanied by historical linguist Marinus van der Sluijs. As a member of Peratt’s team, van der Sluijs conducted his own survey at Tsagaan Uul (Altai Tavan Bogd National Park, western Mongolia), the largest petroglyph field in eastern Asia, in May 2006.

Peratt and van der Sluijs also collaborated on a study of the common symbol of the ouroboros, which they suggest has a specific origin in time, probably the 5th or 4th millennium BCE. They contend that the image was ultimately based on globally independent observations of an intense aurora, with somewhat different characteristics than the familiar aurora. Perhaps the ouroboros represented an auroral oval seen as a whole, at a time when it was smaller and located closer to the equator than now. That could have been the case during geomagnetic excursions, when the geomagnetic field weakens and the earth’s magnetic poles shift places. Tok Thompson and Gregory Allen Schrempp cautiously allow that this speculative idea might “mark a bold new interdisciplinary venture made possible by modern science”.

Peratt's name is listed among the scientists signing "An Open Letter to the Scientific Community" (published in New Scientist in May 2004) that critiques the "growing number of hypothetical entities in the big bang theory". The letter also states that plasma cosmology, the steady-state model and other alternative approaches can also explain the basic phenomena of the cosmos.

Honors 
He has been awarded:
The United States Department of Energy Distinguished Performance Award twice, in 1987 and 1999.
The IEEE Distinguished Lecturer Award in 1993.
The Norwegian Academy of Science and Letters Kristian Birkeland Lecturer in 1995.
IEEE Fellowship in 1999.
The Los Alamos National Laboratory Director’s 30 Years, University of California Service Award in 2006.

He is a member of the American Physical Society, and the American Astronomical Society.

External links 
Plasma Universe
An Open Letter to the Scientific Community

References 

Year of birth missing (living people)
Living people
21st-century American physicists
American plasma physicists
American nuclear physicists